The Prairie Central Railway  was a short railroad line that ran from Decatur to Paris, Illinois. It was based in Decatur, and ran on about  worth of mostly former Pennsylvania, later Penn Central Railroad, Conrail and eventually Wabash Valley Railroad trackage.

The Prairie Central Railway was formed during the 1980s deregulation period by Craig Burroughs, which consisted of several railroad properties.  An affiliate railroad was formed as the Prairie Trunk (PARY) which ran from Flora, Illinois, to Shawneetown, Illinois on former Baltimore and Ohio trackage.

Power for the trains consisted mainly of former Conrail GE U25Bs, tracing their heritage to the Pennsylvania Railroad. Another source lists their roster as also including  GE U30Bs 2883 and 2885 and GM-EMD GP9s 7300 and 7302 originally owned by the New York Central.

The railroad ceased operations in 1984 when Illinois Central Railroad embargoed the line for unpaid trackage rights. After the case was settled, the locomotives were sold for scrap.

References

Defunct Illinois railroads
Decatur, Illinois